Peaceable Kingdom may refer to

 Peaceable Kingdom (theology), an eschatological state inferred from texts such as the Book of Isaiah, the Book of Hosea, and the Sermon on the Mount

Art
 Peaceable Kingdom, a series of 61 paintings by Edward Hicks started in 1820
 "The Peaceable Kingdom", a 1936 a cappella choral work, settings from the book of Isaiah, by Randall Thompson (inspired by the Hicks paintings)
 The Peaceable Kingdom, a 1954 poetry collection by Jon Silkin
 Arrangements of peaceable animals, such as the lamb and lion, in heraldry, etc.

Publications
 A Peaceable Kingdom: the Shaker abecedarius, a 1978 picture book illustrated by Alice and Martin Provensen
 Peaceable Kingdom, a 2003 short story collection by Jack Ketchum
 The Peaceable Kingdom, a 1998 short story collection by Francine Prose
 The Peaceable Kingdom: An American Saga, a 1972 novel by Jan de Hartog
 The Peaceable Kingdom: A Primer in Christian Ethics, a 1983 book by Stanley Hauerwas
 The Peaceable Kingdom, a 1949 novel by Ardyth Kennelly
 "The Peaceable Kingdom", a 1997 essay by Edward Hoagland
 Canada: a Guide to the Peaceable Kingdom, ed. William Kilbourn (1970)

Film and television
 A Peaceable Kingdom, a television drama aired by CBS in 1989
 Peaceable Kingdom (film), a 2004 documentary film about farmers who convert to veganism
Peaceable Kingdom: The Journey Home, a 2009 version of the 2004 film
 The Peaceable Kingdom, a 1971 short film by Stan Brakhage

Music
 "Peaceable Kingdom", a song from Vapor Trails (2002) by Rush
 "Peaceable Kingdom", a song from Trampin' (2004) by Patti Smith